Saved from the truth is the third studio album by Persian power metal act Angband released on September 28, 2012 through Pure Steel Records. as was the case with their previous album the mixing and mastering was handled by well-known producer Achim Kohler (Primal Fear, Amon Amarth).

Track listing

Reception 

The album received generally positive reviews from music critics.

Lords of Metal magazine believes that: "the prog-influences have gained much more room on this album...on 'Saved From The Truth’ the gentlemen show progress on all fronts. musically this is the band's strongest release to date."

Personnel 
Mahyar Dean - guitars
Ashkan Yazdani - vocals
Ramin Rahimi - drums and percussions
Farshad Shokuhfar - bass
Produced by Mahyar Dean
Sound engineered by Soheil Saeedi
Recorded at Rahgoar Studio, Tehran
Mixed and mastered by Achim Kohler at Indiscreet Audio
Cover art by Maziar Dean
Photos by M. Porooshani

References

External links 

Angband at Facebook

2012 albums
Angband (band) albums